St Margarets is a suburb and neighbourhood in the London Borough of Richmond upon Thames, about  west-southwest of central London. It is bounded by the Thames Tideway to the north-east, and the River Crane to the north-west and north where the land tapers between these rivers. Land and buildings closer to Richmond Bridge than the eponymous railway station are, traditionally distinctly, known as East Twickenham. Both places go by their post town and traditional parish, Twickenham quite often; in the 19th century the south of St Margarets was marked on maps as Twickenham Park.

The area hosts a house that J. M. W. Turner saw built during his painting career and St Margarets railway station is within  of Marble Hill House.

Uniquely in London among the few places prefixed Saint it is named after a house. Specifically it is named after a large house together with appurtenant land of an 18th century Scottish-English aristocrat, rather than a church which began in 1930.

History

The place hosted, in the south-east, remnants of the site of an encampment of the barons and their men in 1261. This refers to a minor civil war of the last three weeks of June or so – a power struggle between the crown (ministry of Henry III of England) and the aristocracy, a few uprisings later cemented into constitutional change led by de Montford. The net result of the uprisings was a settled parliamentary system enabling limits to the monarch's powers to tax and departure from such edicts as the Provisions of Oxford and Westminster.

 takes its name from the former Saint Margaret's House, the second guise of which stood from 1827 to 1853. It was the country house of Archibald Kennedy, 1st Marquess of Ailsa (12th Earl of Cassilis), and for a few final decades became the home of the Earl of Kilmorey. Their names can be found in such streets as Kilmorey Gardens and Ailsa Road.

Victorian and Edwardian houses dominate the housing stock. In 1854 the St Margaret's Estate was laid out for building family houses, becoming one of the first garden suburbs.

Today's developed suburb dates from the arrival of the railway. The new railway station was preliminarily "Ailsa Crossing" as it passed through the estate, but it became "St Margarets" before opening. 

A memorial was unveiled in April 2017 to the 6000 Belgian refugees many of the adults of whom lived and worked locally during the First World War. It is on the west bank of the Thames at Warren Gardens, next to the site of the Pelabon Munitions Works.

Annual events
St Margarets Fair is held each July in Moormead Park by the River Crane, a channel from its larger stream, on the western limits.

Buildings

In 1814 the painter J. M. W. Turner had built Solus Lodge in Sandycoombe Road. The house survives as Sandycombe Lodge.

Gordon House is a Grade II-listed Georgian mansion on the river Thames at St Margarets. Like St Margaret's House it was owned by Lord Kilmorey.  The house has a Robert Adam wing, added in 1738. For many years, it was used as part of Brunel University.  In recent years the house has been redeveloped by Octagon Developments, with the former chapel and coachhouse converted to private homes.

The Kilmorey Mausoleum has been moved several times, and is now on the northern edge of St Margarets. It was built in the 1850s by the 2nd Earl of Kilmorey and contains the bodies of the Earl and his mistress, Priscilla Anne Hoste.  Now a Grade II* listed building, it was built to resemble an ancient Egyptian monument. It is jointly maintained by Richmond upon Thames Council and English Heritage. The mausoleum is occasionally open to the public.

The Roman Catholic Church of St Margaret of Scotland on St Margarets Road was built to a modern design of the architect Austin Winckley and opened in 1969. In 1999 it became a Grade II listed building. Its forerunner stood on site from 1938, after the relevant mission begun in an adjoining house in 1930. Twickenham and Isleworth as broad encompassing areas have had no other churches named after the saint. 

In Anglicanism, two late-19th-century-founded Anglican church parishes serve the area. The place represents the north-west third of Saint Stephen's and the eastern two-fifths of All Souls, if the Crane is taken as the northern limit.

Education

There are three main schools nearby, in Twickenham: Orleans Park School (secondary), St. Stephen's Primary School (primary) and Orleans Primary School (primary).

Local commerce and townscape
Two main streets have a range of shops, cafés and bars/pubs serving food. Twickenham Studios are at the heart of the village and have recently announced plans to expand their presence in St Margarets.

The high street has well-frequented local, independent businesses.

Most roads are residential, some of which tree-lined. The most common house type is semi-detached; some detached, mainly those of three or four storeys have been subdivided. To the east of the "village" is the relatively verdant-setting houses and many classical flats (apartment buildings) of Twickenham Park.

Neighbouring areas
Direct neighbours comprise: 
East Twickenham/Cambridge Park to the south-east.
Richmond across the river to the east (accessible across Twickenham Bridge, Richmond Bridge and Richmond Lock Footbridge)
Twickenham from the west through to the south. 
Old Isleworth and the Ivybridge estate, Isleworth is to the north and northwest in the adjoining London Borough of Hounslow.  

Between Richmond Lock and Kew Bridge is the first reach of the Thames proceeding upstream out of Central London with green, wooded expanses on both sides: Kew Gardens, associated golf course, and Syon Park which are all lightly wooded.

Marble Hill House and Marble Hill Park are immediately to the south.

Transport

Road
Much of south St Margarets is in a controlled parking zone (CPZ), which restricts parking to residents and holders of vouchers.

Rail
The normal service from St Margarets station is four stopping-service trains per hour to and from Waterloo. Both Richmond and Twickenham stations are a short bus journey from most parts of the suburb and have status as major stops on the transport network – meaning semi-fast and somewhat fast services call at those stations.

Bus
Two bus routes run through St Margarets: the 110 (Hounslow – Hammersmith) and the H37 (Hounslow – Richmond). Other nearby bus routes are 33, R68, R70 and 490 coming from central Twickenham along Richmond Road; all of these, except 33, go past Richmond station.

Notable inhabitants

Living people

Historical figures

Footnotes and references

Footnotes

Citations

External links 

 St Margarets Community Website
 St Margarets Fair
 Turner's House Twickenham
 Marble Hill House Museum

Areas of London
Districts of London on the River Thames
Districts of the London Borough of Richmond upon Thames
Places formerly in Middlesex
St Margarets, London
Twickenham